FK Jedinstvo Surčin is a football club based in Surčin, Belgrade, Serbia. They compete in the Serbian League Belgrade, the third tier of the national league system.

History
In 2002, the club won the Belgrade Zone League and took promotion to the Serbian League Belgrade. They spent four seasons in the third tier, before suffering relegation back to the Belgrade Zone League in 2006. The club was subsequently relegated to the Belgrade First League in 2007 and eventually to the Belgrade Second League in 2008, ending up in the sixth tier of Serbian football.

Honours
Belgrade Zone League (Tier 4)
 2001–02
Belgrade First League (Tier 5)
 2013–14 (Group A)
Belgrade Second League (Tier 6)
 2011–12 (Group Danube)

Notable players
This is a list of players who have played at full international level.
  Stevo Nikolić
  Branislav Jovanović
For a list of all FK Jedinstvo Surčin players with a Wikipedia article, see :Category:FK Jedinstvo Surčin players.

Managerial history

References

External links
 Club page at Srbijasport

1928 establishments in Serbia
Association football clubs established in 1928
Football clubs in Belgrade
Surčin